Lakeyah Danaee Robinson (born February 28, 2001), known mononymously as Lakeyah, is an American rapper and singer. Born and raised in Milwaukee, Wisconsin, she began rapping at the age of 15. At 18, she moved to Atlanta and was signed to Quality Control Music. In 2021, she was announced as part of the XXL magazine freshman class, the first from Milwaukee.

Early life 
Lakeyah Danaee Robinson was born on February 28, 2001, in Milwaukee, Wisconsin, where she was also raised. In high school, she began on the slam poetry team before she was convinced by friends at the age of 15 to rap for the #SoGoneChallenge where people submit performances of rap verses to the instrumental of the song "So Gone" by Monica.

In 2017, she joined the music duo "BTM" (Beyond the Music) and they achieved over one million YouTube views.

In 2019, she went on a birthday trip for her 18th birthday to Atlanta, Georgia and visited rapper T.I.'s Trap Museum and its exhibit on Quality Control Music. Inspired to move to Atlanta, she enrolled at the Art Institute of Atlanta for college but dropped out after two months.

Career 
Lakeyah stayed in Atlanta after dropping out of college and went viral for the #FirstDayOutChallenge, a rap challenge celebrating rapper JT from music group City Girls being released from prison. After that challenge and going viral from a freestyle over the song "We Paid" by 42 Dugg and Lil Baby, she was signed to Quality Control Music. On October 9, 2020, Lakeyah released her first single, "Big FlexHER", featuring 42 Dugg. It amassed over 400,000 views in five days and currently has over three million views.

On December 11, 2020, Lakeyah released her debut album, Time's Up. It included the single "Female Goat" featuring City Girls and a Midwest style beat by Detroit producer Reuel StopPlaying. It is Lakeyah's most popular track on YouTube, with over 16 million views.

In the spring of 2021, Lakeyah was named a brand ambassador for Rihanna's lingerie line, Savage X Fenty.

On April 9, 2021, Lakeyah released her second project, In Due Time. The album included features from Gucci Mane and Yung Bleu. After the album's release, Lakeyah was 4th on Rolling Stones Breakthrough 25 charts, which ranks the fastest rising new artists, behind Cico P.

On June 16, 2021, XXL magazine named Lakeyah to the 2021 XXL Freshman Class, a spotlight for up and coming rappers that previously featured Kendrick Lamar, Travis Scott, Chance the Rapper, and Megan thee Stallion. She was the first Milwaukee rapper named an XXL freshman in its 14 year history.

Discography

Mixtapes

EPs

Singles

As lead artist

References 

2001 births
Living people
21st-century American rappers
Rappers from Wisconsin
People from Milwaukee
American women rappers
African-American women rappers
LGBT African Americans
LGBT people from Wisconsin
21st-century American women
Lesbian musicians
LGBT rappers
21st-century women rappers